This is a list of craters on Venus, named by the International Astronomical Union's (IAU) Working Group for Planetary System Nomenclature. All craters on Venus are named after famous women or female first names. (For features on Venus other than craters see, list of montes on Venus and List of coronae on Venus.)

As of 2017, there are 900 named craters on Venus, fewer than the lunar and Martian craters but more than on Mercury.

Other, non-planetary bodies with numerous named craters include Callisto (141), Ganymede (131), Rhea (128), Vesta (90), Ceres (90), Dione (73), Iapetus (58), Enceladus (53), Tethys (50) and Europa (41). For a full list, see List of craters in the Solar System.

A 

back to top

B 

back to top

C 

back to top

D 

back to top

E 

back to top

F 

back to top

G 

back to top

H 

back to top

I 

back to top

J 

back to top

K 

back to top

L 

back to top

M 

back to top

N 

back to top

O 

back to top

P 

back to top

Q 

back to top

R 

back to top

S 

back to top

T 

back to top

U 

back to top

V 

back to top

W 

back to top

X 

back to top

Y 

back to top

Z 

back to top

Dropped and not approved names 

back to top

See also 
 List of montes on Venus
 List of coronae on Venus
List of geological features on Venus

Notes

References

External links 
 USGS: Venus nomenclature
 USGS: Venus Nomenclature: Craters

 
Venus
Craters